In mathematics, R-algebroids are constructed starting from groupoids. These are more abstract concepts than the Lie algebroids that play a similar role in the theory of Lie groupoids to that of Lie algebras in the theory of Lie groups. (Thus, a Lie algebroid can be thought of as 'a Lie algebra with many objects ').

Definition
An R-algebroid, is constructed from a groupoid  as follows.

R-category
A groupoid  can be regarded as a category with invertible morphisms.
Then an R-category is defined as an extension of the R-algebroid concept by replacing the groupoid  in this construction with a general category C that does not have all morphisms invertible.

R-algebroids via convolution products
One can also define the R-algebroid, to be the set of functions  with finite support, and with the convolution product defined as follows:
 .

Only this second construction is natural for the topological case, when one needs to replace 'function' by 'continuous function with compact support', and in this case .

Examples 
Every Lie algebra is a Lie algebroid over the one point manifold.
The Lie algebroid associated to a Lie groupoid.

See also

References

Sources

Algebras
Algebraic topology
Category theory
Lie algebras
Lie groupoids